Mansfield Center is a census-designated place (CDP) in the town of Mansfield in Bristol County, Massachusetts, United States.  The population was 7,360 at the 2010 census.

Geography
Mansfield Center is located at  (42.028249, -71.218807).

According to the United States Census Bureau, the CDP has a total area of 7.5 km2 (2.9 mi2). 7.4 km2 (2.9 mi2) of it is land and 0.1 km2 (0.04 mi2) of it (1.04%) is water.

Demographics

As of the census of 2000, there were 7,320 people, 3,039 households, and 1,841 families residing in the CDP. The population density was 988.2/km2 (2,556.1/mi2). There were 3,147 housing units at an average density of 424.8/km2 (1,098.9/mi2). The racial makeup of the CDP was 94.43% White, 2.39% African American, 0.23% Native American, 1.48% Asian, 0.04% Pacific Islander, 0.51% from other races, and 0.93% from two or more races. Hispanic or Latino of any race were 1.73% of the population.

There were 3,039 households, out of which 30.8% had children under the age of 18 living with them, 47.1% were married couples living together, 10.4% had a female householder with no husband present, and 39.4% were non-families. 32.7% of all households were made up of individuals, and 10.2% had someone living alone who was 65 years of age or older. The average household size was 2.39 and the average family size was 3.11.

In the CDP, the population was spread out, with 25.0% under the age of 18, 6.2% from 18 to 24, 39.7% from 25 to 44, 18.9% from 45 to 64, and 10.2% who were 65 years of age or older. The median age was 34 years. For every 100 females, there were 98.1 males. For every 100 females age 18 and over, there were 92.8 males.

The median income for a household in the CDP was $51,082, and the median income for a family was $68,191. Males had a median income of $42,151 versus $36,015 for females. The per capita income for the CDP was $25,693. About 3.2% of families and 6.0% of the population were below the poverty line, including 3.4% of those under age 18 and 14.7% of those age 65 or over.

References

Census-designated places in Bristol County, Massachusetts
Mansfield, Massachusetts
Providence metropolitan area
Census-designated places in Massachusetts